Sergey Berezin (born 11 March 1960) is a Soviet speed skater. He competed at the 1980 Winter Olympics, the 1984 Winter Olympics and the 1988 Winter Olympics.

References

1960 births
Living people
Soviet male speed skaters
Olympic speed skaters of the Soviet Union
Speed skaters at the 1980 Winter Olympics
Speed skaters at the 1984 Winter Olympics
Speed skaters at the 1988 Winter Olympics
Sportspeople from Nizhny Novgorod